Damián Cáceres Rodríguez (born 31 May 2003), sometimes simply known as Damián, is a Spanish footballer who plays for Spanish club Sporting B as a midfielder.

Club career
Born in Moraleja de Enmedio, Community of Madrid, Damián joined CF Fuenlabrada's youth setup in 2018, aged 15, after representing CF Trival Valderas and CD Móstoles URJC. On 16 December 2020, before even having appeared with the reserves, he made his first team debut at the age of 17 by coming on as a late substitute for Tahiru Awudu in a 1–0 away success over CD Atlético Baleares, for the season's Copa del Rey.

Damián made his professional debut on 19 December 2020; after replacing Jano in the 57th minute, he scored his team's third six minutes later in a 3–2 Segunda División away win against RCD Mallorca. He also became the youngest player of Fuenla to debut (also to score) in professional football.

On 9 June 2022, Damian signed two-year contract with Sporting de Gijón B in Tercera Federación.

References

External links

2003 births
Living people
Spanish footballers
Footballers from the Community of Madrid
Association football midfielders
Segunda División players
Divisiones Regionales de Fútbol players
CF Fuenlabrada footballers
CF Fuenlabrada B players
Sporting de Gijón B players